Momčilo Mrkaić (born 12 September 1990) is a Bosnian professional footballer who plays as a centre-forward for Bosnian Premier League club Borac Banja Luka.

Club career
Born in Trebinje, SR Bosnia and Herzegovina, he started playing with local club FK Leotar which was playing in the Premier League of Bosnia and Herzegovina at the time. Soon he was spotted as a talented youngster and in the summer of 2009 he was already moving abroad, to Serbia, and signing with New Belgrade-based club FK Bežanija.

A former Serbian SuperLiga member, Bežanija was fighting back then in the Serbian First League for its return to the SuperLiga. Mrkaić made 14 appearances in the first half of the season and then accepted to play on loan in Belarusian Premier League side FC Gomel the next half season. He won the Belarusian Cup while at Gomel in the 2010–11 cup season. 

The following seasons, he played in Serbian second level sides FK Zemun and FK BSK Borča.  During the winter-break of the 2014–15 season he returned to Bosnia and signed with Premier League side FK Drina Zvornik.  Since then he played with another three Premier League clubs, FK Radnik Bijeljina, NK Vitez and HŠK Zrinjski Mostar. With Zrinjski he won the league title in the 2016–17 season.

After Zrinjski, Mrkaić returned to Serbia and played for FK Javor Ivanjica, before signing with another Serbian SuperLiga club in the summer of 2018, FK Zemun, where he has been playing ever since.

In January 2020, Mrkaić signed a contract with Vojvodina until the end of 2022–23 season.

Honours

Player

Club
Gomel
 Belarusian Cup: 2010–11

Zrinjski Mostar
 Bosnian Premier League: 2016–17

Vojvodina 

 Serbian Cup: 2019–20

References

External links
 

1990 births
Living people
People from Trebinje
Association football forwards
Serbs of Bosnia and Herzegovina
Bosnia and Herzegovina footballers
FK Leotar players
FK Bežanija players
FC Gomel players
FK Zemun players
FK BSK Borča players
FK Drina Zvornik players
FK Radnik Bijeljina players
NK Vitez players
HŠK Zrinjski Mostar players
FK Javor Ivanjica players
FK Vojvodina players
Premier League of Bosnia and Herzegovina players
Serbian SuperLiga players
Belarusian Premier League players
Bosnia and Herzegovina expatriate footballers
Expatriate footballers in Serbia
Bosnia and Herzegovina expatriate sportspeople in Serbia
Expatriate footballers in Belarus
Bosnia and Herzegovina expatriate sportspeople in Belarus